Odete Maria Freitas Belo (born 21 February 1966) is an East Timorese physician and politician, and a member of the Fretilin political party. She is the incumbent Minister of Health, serving since 29 May 2020 in the VIII Constitutional Government of East Timor led by Prime Minister Taur Matan Ruak.

Early life and education
Belo was born in Baucau, in the then Portuguese Timor (now East Timor). In 1996, she graduated from Udayana University, in Denpasar, Bali, Indonesia, with a degree in medicine, and in 2010, she completed a Master's degree in Public Health at Gadjah Mada University, Sleman Regency, Yogyakarta, Indonesia.

Career 
Initially, Belo practised general medicine for more than five years in the Viqueque Municipality. She then spent 24 years as a health services manager and administrator.

Between 2010 and 2012, Belo was Deputy Director for Cooperation and Management of External Health Funds. From 2012, she was Chairman of the Temporary Management and Functioning Committee of the Autonomous Service of Medicines and Health Equipment E.P.. In 2015, she was appointed as chairman of the Liquidation Committee of the same public enterprise.

As of the onset of the COVID-19 pandemic in East Timor in early 2020, Belo was the general director of health care at the Ministry of Health. On 13 April 2020, she announced, in that capacity, that when the number of severely ill COVID-19 patients increased, the government would use the old 150-room  as a medical facility for them. At that time, the government was using a facility in Vera Cruz as an isolation centre for moderate COVID-19 patients; Belo also announced that if that facility became full, then an isolation centre in Tasi-tolu would be used for mild patients.

On 29 May 2020, following a change in the governing coalition, and the admission of Fretilin to the VIII Constitutional Government, Belo was sworn in as Minister of Health.

References

External links 

East Timorese physicians
Fretilin politicians
Government ministers of East Timor
Health ministers of East Timor
Living people
Women government ministers of East Timor
1973 births
21st-century women politicians